Naked is the tenth studio album released only in Japan by Joan Jett and the Blackhearts. The album was released on April 27, 2004.

Track listing

Personnel

The Blackhearts
Joan Jett - rhythm guitar, lead vocals, producer on track 7 
Doug Cangialosi - lead guitar, backing vocals
Sami Yaffa - bass, backing vocals
Thommy Price - drums
Kenny Laguna - keyboards, backing vocals, producer on all tracks

Additional musicians
Tony "Bruno" Rey - guitars, backing vocals, producer on track 10, engineer
Joey Levine, Kathleen Hanna - backing vocals
Chris Palmero - orchestral arrangements on track 14

Production
Joey Levine - producer on tracks 2 and 14
Ted Templeman - producer on tracks 4, 9, 11-13
Bob Rock - producer on tracks 8, 15 and 16
Jeff Hendrickson, Joe Johnson, John Squicciarino, Randy Staub, John Aiosa, Paul Silveira, Brian Dobbs, Dave Liles, Jeff Delbello, Victor Luke, Frank Garfi, Thom Panunzio - engineers
Peter Kuperschmid - engineer, mastering at Soundnet Studios

References

Joan Jett albums
2004 albums
Albums produced by Ted Templeman
Albums produced by Bob Rock
Blackheart Records albums